Mościsko  is a village in the administrative district of Gmina Dzierżoniów, within Dzierżoniów County, Lower Silesian Voivodeship, in south-western Poland. In 2011 the village has a population of 1,128. Prior to the border changes of 1945 it was in Germany.

Notable people
Mojsije Margel - Croatian rabbi, lexicographer and Hebrew scholar

References

Villages in Dzierżoniów County